Oleg Grachev (born August 6, 1974) is a Russian former professional ice hockey goaltender. He is a two-time Russian Champion.

Awards and honors

References

External links
Biographical information and career statistics from Eliteprospects.com, or The Internet Hockey Database

1972 births
Living people
Ak Bars Kazan players
HK Gomel players
Neftyanik Almetyevsk players
Barys Nur-Sultan players
Khimik-SKA Novopolotsk players
Ariada Volzhsk players
Russian ice hockey goaltenders
Sportspeople from Kazan